Simon Nabatov (born 11 January 1959) is a Russian-American jazz pianist.

Early life
Nabatov was born in Moscow on 11 January 1959. His parents were Leon, a professional pianist and choir conductor who was a native of Belarus, and Regina. Nabatov began playing the piano at the age of three and his first composition was at six.

He attended a Duke Ellington concert in Moscow in 1971 and his determination to become a jazz musician was reinforced a year later at a Thad Jones–Mel Lewis Orchestra performance. By the age of 17 he was playing bebop with other musicians in Moscow. His formal education in music was at the Central School of Music and then the Moscow Conservatory.

Nabatov and his parents were permitted to leave the Soviet Union in 1979. This was ostensibly to join family members in Israel, but the Nabatovs instead flew to Italy and applied for visas to enter the United States. While waiting for a visa, Nabatov gained experience by becoming the house pianist at the Mississippi Jazz Club in Rome and was helped and encouraged by clarinettist Tony Scott. The family eventually reached the United States and settled in LeFrak City in Queens, New York City.

Later life and career
Nabatov attended the Juilliard School from 1980 to 1984. In 1981, he accompanied avant-garde dancer Kazuo Ohno in performances in New York. In 1984, the magazine Keyboard named him Best Pianist. After graduating, "he played chamber music and accompanied choirs and former Soviet singing stars touring the growing circuit of Russian communities in the United States." He became an American citizen in 1986. That year, he recorded a trio album, Circle the Line, with bassist Ed Schuller and drummer Paul Motian. Often travelling to Europe, he was a member of bands led by Ray Anderson, Arthur Blythe, Steve Lacy and Perry Robinson, and played with the NDR Hamburg radio big band. Nabatov also toured Germany with Matthias Schubert, "with the drummer Ernst Bier, and with a tap-dance group". In 1989, he and his German partner settled in Cologne.

Nabatov made his name with a series of inventive trio albums with Mark Helias and Tom Rainey; he also often works with the trombonist Nils Wogram in duet or in larger ensembles. His most important work so far, however, has been a series of albums on Leo devoted to jazz tone-poem responses to Russian authors. Nature Morte is based on a poem by Joseph Brodsky; The Master and Margarita is a suite inspired by the novel of the same name by Mikhail Bulgakov; and A Few Incidences contains octet settings of the enigmatic texts of the poet Daniil Kharms. Crucial to the two vocal discs have been the contributions of British singer Phil Minton.

Nabatov has taught at several institutions, including the Folkwang Hochschule in Essen (1989–91), the International Jazz and Rock Academy in Remscheid (1991–93), and the Musikhochschule Luzern.

Discography

As leader/co-leader

As sideman
With Perry Robinson
 Nightmare Island Live at the Leverkusener Jazztage (West Wind, 1989)
 Call to the Stars (West Wind, 1990)
 Angelology (Phonector, 2006)

With Nils Wogram
 Round Trip (Enja, 1996)
 Speed Life (Enja, 1998)
 Odd and Awkward (Enja, 2001)
 Construction Field (Altrisuoni, 2003)
 The Move (Between the Lines, 2005)
 Portrait of a Band (Enja, 2007)
 Moods & Modes (Nwog, 2010)

With others
 Franco Ambrosetti, Music for Symphony and Jazz Band (Enja, 1991)
 Ray Anderson, Every One of Us (Gramavision, 1992)
 Michael Gibbs & NDR Bigband, Back in the Days (Cuneiform, 2012)
 Alfred 23 Harth, POPendingEYE (Free Flow Music, 1993)
 Rolf Liebermann & NDR Big Band, Concerto for Jazz Band and Symphony Orchestra (Naxos, 2002)
 Rudi Mahall, Nicht Ohne Robert Vol. 1 (Jazz Haus Musik, 2009)
 Paul Motian, Circle the Line (GM, 1988)
 Marcin Oles, Walk Songs (Fenommedia, 2006)
 Daniel Schnyder, Winds (Koch, 1991)

 Sources

References

1959 births
Avant-garde jazz pianists
Juilliard School alumni
Living people
Musicians from Moscow
Russian jazz pianists
21st-century pianists
Leo Records artists
ACT Music artists
NoBusiness Records artists